Selena Live! The Last Concert is a live album by Mexican-American singer Selena. It was recorded on February 26, 1995, at the Houston Astrodome and was televised live on Univision. The album was posthumously released by EMI Latin on March 27, 2001. The singer shared the concert with Tejano singer Emilio Navaira and performed to 66,994 people, which broke the previous attendance record held by Selena the previous year. The concert was critically acclaimed for outperforming ticket sales by country music singers Vince Gill, Reba McEntire, and George Strait. Selena's performance at the astrodome became her final televised concert before she was shot and killed on March 31, 1995.

At the time of her performance, journalists gave the singer rave reviews, citing the range of material performed, as well as Selena's "sultry, and sensual" choreography. Critics have since regarded the concert as one of her best performances—it was dramatized by Jennifer Lopez in the 1997 biopic film. The purple jumpsuit worn during the performance—on display in a museum the singer's family operates in Corpus Christi, Texas—continues to be a popular halloween costume for children and adults.

The set list mostly included material from her Amor Prohibido (1994) album and a medley mashup of disco music songs "I Will Survive", "Funkytown", "Last Dance", "The Hustle", and "On the Radio", by Gloria Gaynor, Lipps Inc., and Van McCoy respectively, while "Last Dance" and "On the Radio" were originally performed by Donna Summer. The album peaked atop the US Billboard Latin Pop Albums chart, becoming the singer's second number one on the chart since Dreaming of You (1995). It earned the singer a nomination for Pop Album of the Year, Female at the 2002 Billboard Latin Music Awards.

DVD release
Live: The Last Concert was released on DVD on September 2, 2003 by Image Entertainment and Q-Productions, Inc.

Among the features contained in the DVD, the viewer is allowed to select from two different main menus, Spanish or English, in order to change the language of the biography and menu. With a running time of 99-minutes, the DVD features a biography of the singer and an additional 44-minute behind-the-scenes look at the making of Selena (1997). The DVD chapter listing is identical to the album track listing with the exception of the spoken liner notes.

Track listing

Charts and certifications

Weekly charts

References

Bibliography 

2001 live albums
2002 live albums
2003 video albums
2015 live albums
2017 live albums
2017 video albums
Live albums published posthumously
Live video albums
Selena live albums
Selena video albums
Albums produced by A.B. Quintanilla
Video albums published posthumously
Spanish-language live albums